Urola nivalis, the snowy urola moth, is a moth of the family Crambidae. It is found from southern Canada and Maine, south to Florida and west to Illinois and Texas.

The wingspan is 15-23 mm. Adults are on wing from May to September in two generations per year.

The larvae feed on various grasses and are considered a pest of Ligustrum species.

References

Moths described in 1773
Taxa named by Dru Drury
Argyriini